Colobothea aleata is a species of beetle in the family Cerambycidae. It was described by Bates in 1885. It is known from Mexico and Venezuela.

References

aleata
Beetles described in 1885